"Ch'ella mi creda" is a tenor aria from act 3 of the opera La fanciulla del West by Giacomo Puccini. It is the tenor aria sung by Dick Johnson (a.k.a. the bandit "Ramerrez") before he is to be executed by a lynch mob of gold prospectors led by Sheriff Jack Rance. In the aria, Johnson asks them not to tell Minnie, whom he loves, that he has been killed. Instead, he asks them to "let her believe" (the title phrase, "ch'ella mi creda") that he is far away, on the road to redemption from his bandit past.

The aria was sung for the first time by Enrico Caruso, at the world premiere of La fanciulla del West at the Metropolitan Opera in New York on 10 December 1910. It is said that during World War I, Italian soldiers sang this aria to maintain their spirits. The aria is also popular as a piece in concerts and excerpt albums.

At the Metropolitan Opera's 125th anniversary gala on March 15, 2009, Plácido Domingo sang the aria in a recreation of the scene as it had been performed by Caruso at the premiere nearly 100 years earlier. David Belasco's set and the original costumes were recreated for the event. The production designers of the gala told The New York Times that the image of Caruso in La fanciulla del West (see inset) in the act 3 scene in which "Ch'ella mi creda" is sung was the first image from the Met's past that the team set out to recreate for the gala.

Libretto

References

External links
 "Per lei, per lei soltanto .. Ch'ella mi creda", piano–vocal score, William and Gayle Cook Music Library, Indiana University School of Music
 Library catalog, Indiana University
 List of noted arias from aria-database.com

Arias by Giacomo Puccini
Opera excerpts